Year 207 (CCVII) was a common year starting on Thursday (link will display the full calendar) of the Julian calendar. At the time, it was known as the Year of the Consulship of Maximus and Severus (or, less frequently, year 960 Ab urbe condita). The denomination 207 for this year has been used since the early medieval period, when the Anno Domini calendar era became the prevalent method in Europe for naming years.

Events 
 By place 
 China 
 Battle of White Wolf Mountain: Warlord Cao Cao defeats the Wuhuan tribes, sending the Wuhuan into decline.

Births 
 Liu Shan (or Gongsi), Chinese emperor (d. 271)

Deaths 
 Guo Jia, Chinese adviser and official (b. 170)
 Tadun, Chinese chieftain of the Wuhuan tribe
 Yuan Shang, Chinese warlord and governor
 Yuan Xi (or Xianyong), Chinese warlord 
 Zhang Xiu, Chinese general and warlord

References